The family Drepanidae contains about 400 species, of which only eight occur in Europe. Six of these are resident in Great Britain and one is an occasional immigrant:

 Falcaria lacertinaria, scalloped hook-tip — throughout
 Watsonalla binaria, oak hook-tip — south, central (Vulnerable) ‡*
 Watsonalla cultraria, barred hook-tip — south, central (local)

 Drepana falcataria, pebble hook-tip
 Drepana falcataria falcataria — south, centre
 Drepana falcataria scotica — northern Scotland (local)
 Drepana curvatula, dusky hook-tip — south, east (immigrant)
 Sabra harpagula, scarce hook-tip — south-west (Red Data Book)
 Cilix glaucata, Chinese character — south and centre (common), local in Scotland

Species listed in the 2007 UK Biodiversity Action Plan (BAP) are indicated by a double-dagger symbol (‡)—species so listed for research purposes only are also indicated with an asterisk (‡*).

See also
List of moths of Great Britain (overview)
Family lists: Hepialidae, Cossidae, Zygaenidae, Limacodidae, Sesiidae, Lasiocampidae, Saturniidae, Endromidae, Drepanidae, Thyatiridae, Geometridae, Sphingidae, Notodontidae, Thaumetopoeidae, Lymantriidae, Arctiidae, Ctenuchidae, Nolidae, Noctuidae and Micromoths

References 

 Waring, Paul, Martin Townsend and Richard Lewington (2003) Field Guide to the Moths of Great Britain and Ireland. British Wildlife Publishing, Hook, UK. .

Moths
Britain